The Clark County Court House is a Greek Revival courthouse in downtown Winchester, Kentucky, United States.

Built in 1853, it is the fourth building on this site, and still houses the Circuit Courtroom and Family Courtroom for the Administrative Office of the Courts.

The building was added to the National Register of Historic Places in 1974.

It is the centerpiece of the Winchester Downtown Commercial District, also NRHP-listed.

See also 
 Kerr Building: also a contributing building to the historic district
 National Register of Historic Places listings in Clark County, Kentucky

References 

County courthouses in Kentucky
National Register of Historic Places in Clark County, Kentucky
Towers in Kentucky
Clock towers in Kentucky
Courthouses on the National Register of Historic Places in Kentucky
1855 establishments in Kentucky
Winchester, Kentucky
Greek Revival architecture in Kentucky
Individually listed contributing properties to historic districts on the National Register in Kentucky